The Indiana dunes have been a cross road of activity since the glacier receded.  Great explorers such as Jacques Marquette and René-Robert Cavelier, Sieur de La Salle traversed this area.  As early as 1862, the area was noted for its unique natural resources.  At the start of the 20th century, the dunes were a living laboratory for scientist studying plants, animals, and the changes in the land.  The first ecologist (Henry Chandler Cowles) did his pioneering work here.

A student of Cowles, O. D. Frank continued Cowle's studies.  A museum honoring his work called the Hour Glass is located in Ogden Dunes.  Many citizens and politicians have helped to preserve parts of the Indiana Dunes.

Chronology

References

Indiana Dunes National Park